The Rumproller is an album by jazz trumpeter Lee Morgan released on the Blue Note label.  It was recorded mainly on April 21, 1965 and features performances by Morgan with Joe Henderson, Ronnie Mathews, Victor Sproles, and Billy Higgins.

Reception
The AllMusic review by Scott Yanow awarded the album 3 stars stating "This album is worth picking up but it is not essential."

Track listing 
All compositions by Lee Morgan except where noted
 "The Rumproller" (Andrew Hill) - 10:29
 "Desert Moonlight" - 9:26
 "Eclipso" - 6:56
 "Edda" (Wayne Shorter) - 7:23
 "The Lady" (Rudy Stevenson) - 7:34

Bonus track on CD reissue:
"Venus di Mildrew" (Shorter) - 6:26

Personnel 
 Lee Morgan - trumpet
 Joe Henderson - tenor saxophone
 Ronnie Mathews - piano
 Victor Sproles - bass
 Billy Higgins - drums

References 

Hard bop albums
Lee Morgan albums
1966 albums
Blue Note Records albums
Albums produced by Alfred Lion
Albums recorded at Van Gelder Studio